Henry Piet Drury van Asch  (4 May 1911 – 27 October 1996, in Hastings, New Zealand) was a New Zealand aviator, aerial photographer and surveyor. He was born in Waitotara, Wanganui, New Zealand in 1911.

The first aircraft van Asch bought, in 1936, was a Monospar ST-25 Universal which he named Manu Rere (registered as ZK-AFF).

The Monospar was retired in 1943 and Aerial Mapping took delivery of a Beechcraft AT-11 Kansan, which had been imported by the RNZAF.
In 1967 the old Monospar was restored and put back into flying condition, it was the last remaining plane of its sort.

After having logged about 6700 commercial flying hours van Asch retired in 1980.

Van Asch was one of the prime figures responsible for the transformation of New Zealand's cadastral maps into accurate topographical maps. He was an honorary member of the New Zealand Institute of Surveyors and a Fellow of the Royal Aeronautical Society.

In the 1953 Coronation Honours, van Asch was appointed a Member of the Order of the British Empire, for services to civil aviation, especially in connection with aerial survey. He was promoted to Commander of the Order of the British Empire, for services to aerial mapping, in the 1979 Queen's Birthday Honours.

Van Asch died on 27 October 1996 in Hastings.  He was survived by his wife, two daughters and a son.

External links 
 Picture of van Asch at his desk at the offices of New Zealand Aerial Mapping Limited

References

1911 births
1996 deaths
New Zealand aviators
New Zealand surveyors
New Zealand Commanders of the Order of the British Empire